Regina Metzler (born 25 October 2005) is a Hungarian ice hockey player and member of the Hungarian national team, currently playing in the Midget AA league of the Ontario Women's Hockey Association (OWHA) with the Ontario Hockey Academy (OHA) Tardiff Jrs.

Playing career
Metzler began her senior league career in the Women's Ice Hockey Bundesliga (DEBL) during the 2018–19 season with KMH Budapest II, the women's development team of KMH Budapest. She made her European Women's Hockey League (EWHL) debut with the women's representative team of KMH Budapest during the playoffs of the 2020–21 season and played part of the 2021–22 season with the team. During the 2021–22 season, she spent a month with the Hockey Training Institute (HTI) Stars women's under-20 team, based in Mulmur, Ontario, Canada.

International play
At the 2020 Winter Youth Olympics, she won a bronze medal in the girls' 3x3 mixed tournament with Team Blue Crystals, an international team of thirteen under-16 players that included Sidre Özer, who became the first Turkish ice hockey player to ever win an Olympic medal at the event. 

With the Hungarian national under-18 team, she participated in the Division I Group A tournaments of the IIHF U18 Women's World Championship in 2020 and 2022. Aged fourteen years and two months, she was the youngest Hungarian player at the 2020 tournament and tied Petra Szamosfalvi for third in team scoring with 1 goal and 1 assist. The 2022 tournament was a breakout for Metzler, who led all tournament skaters in goals scored, with 5 goals in three games played, and recorded the tournament’s best face-off percentage, at 75.41%. In recognition of her exemplary play in the 2022 tournament, she was selected as the Best Player of the Hungarian team by the coaches.

She served as captain of the Hungarian team in the girls' ice hockey tournament at the 2022 European Youth Olympic Winter Festival in Kainuu, Finland during March 2022.

Metzler represented Hungary at the IIHF Women's World Championship in 2021 and 2022.

Career statistics

International

References

External links
 
 

2005 births
Living people
Expatriate ice hockey players in Canada
Hungarian expatriate sportspeople in Canada
Hungarian women's ice hockey players
Ice hockey players at the 2020 Winter Youth Olympics
KMH Budapest (women) players
Medalists at the 2020 Winter Youth Olympics